Dragan Uskoković, Cetinje, Montenegro, 1950, Serbian and Montenigrin playwright, storyteller and journalist.

Life

Born in 1950. in Cetinje. Comes from an old teacher and priest family. He graduated from high school in Podgorica, during which time, he played at a theatre. In Belgrade he studied Russian language & literature and Ethnology, delivered milk and washed windows, so he could graduate from Faculty od Dramatic Arts (1978). He lives in Belgrade. Writes in Serbian language.

Works

He published three books:
Pile od sokola (Falcon chick), a choice of short satirical stories, 1989.
Djina, satirical stories 2007. and,
Čomige (Head bumps), a choice from drama opus, 2001.
 
He worked mostly as a journalist in newspapers published daily and periodically. He worked on radio and television, as well. He wrote for Osmica, Pobjeda, Enigma, Radio Belgrade Channel 3, Stvaranje, Jež, Politika, Večernje novosti, Zastava film, Zeta film and for television broadcasters, such as Radio Television Serbia and Radio-Television of Montenegro. He founded Žižak, first Serbian crossword magazine for the blind, in Braille—probably the only one of its kind in the world.

He wrote numerous plays for the theatre, such as Čegović, Jabanci (Strangers), Prispjenak, Stidna kapica, Ua, kiša (Boo, rain), Plajvaz (Pencil). His most famous work Čegović was performed continuously for more than 25 years.

He wrote for the film (Božićna pesma, Jove, Mlađi brat), and for the television, too: Đe to ima (Where do you have that), Ko si, šta si (Who are you, what are you) and Skriveno blago (Hidden treasure).

He is represented in various theatre, prose and satire anthologies. His works have been translated into Macedonian and Uzbek language, while Čegović itself has been published in 100.000 copies in Russian language alone. Uskoković did some translating himself from several Slavic languages.

Accolades
 
He received numerous awards:
Oktobarska nagrada grada Beograda (City of Belgrade October Award) for Čegović (1978),
Zlatni prsten i Povelja za uređivački podvig (Golden ring and Editorial accomplishment charter) from Journalist Association of Serbia (2006),
Plaketa Bijeli Pavle (Bijeli Pavle plaque) for best storybook Djina (2007),
Povelja za dramu (Drama charter) for third best drama play in Serbian language for the period 1944–1994. year (1994),
Braća Ormai (Ormai brothers) award for satire (2003),
Ježeva bodlja (Hedgehog's sting) award (2003),
Milutin Uskoković award for the best short story in Serbian language (2013).
Radoje Domanović Award of the Association of Writers of Serbia for the contribution to Serbian literary satire, 2017.

Critique

Matija Bećković: “Language is the one that gives extent, importance and length of the story. Uskoković serves it with monk-like humility, as if the laws of the language are stronger than the forces of life. Authentic and nonpathetic, hidden behind discreet humour, the writer does all to make sure he is seen less and his world seen more. Archaic man is alive. He came to the city, provided himself with a car, a telephone, a refrigerator. He overlasted, because his language overlasted and brought him to this day. Literature knows not for secondary languages, secondary people and secondary human destinies. Once again it showed that a man is only what can be discovered based on language. Uskoković protagonist shows himself as the one that earlier wouldn’t be fit for public, or the books, for that matter. When he was supposed to present himself, he would always groom himself, wear a disguise, put on a make-up. All that to be worthy of a memory. But by doing so, he would let himself down, stray from the life and the truth. But, just as the mountain stream carries the card box, the current of the language carries the loanword or its twisted form. It is enough just to guess the first word—and Uskoković’s stories are a testament to that—and other words will follow, in accordance with supreme laws and lingual habits.” 

Dr Ratko Božović: “Continuously, artfully consistently, Uskoković weaved his drama, storytelling, satire and comedy cloth, colorful and unpredictable, as a sign of clear individual recognition. No matter how his poetics belongs to ‘this’ time, it belongs to ‘that’ time, as well. To such extent is his drama work embedded in traditional loom. Peculiar, to that point unknown and painted with strong mentality features, characters meet the modern man with original language, incredible idiomatics. The value of Uskoković's drama is not in outer fable, but in inner world and the language of its protagonists. In fact, what are his personae dramatis like? What is the quality they have in common? Maybe it's the unexpected—they are all made of loneliness. It will appear that what is urban will become the doom of collective experience, that it has immense difficulties achieving identity, as if the meaning and purpose of individual life faces with utopia which won't accept personality degradation and it's inefficacy. He concludes—at the battlefield of author's critique ethos there is a clear intent to demystify the ruling beliefs and dethrone deep-rooted moral patterns."

Dr Zoran Božović: “Dragan Uskoković’s short stories are written in picturesque, juicy language and they contributed to powerful breakthrough of Montenigrin topics into Serbian and Yugoslav literature. Uskoković judges the time we live in using numerous storytelling methods in his book Pile od sokola (Falcon chick)—starting from interesting plot, in medias res, to narrative storytelling process. Uskoković’s narrator can be ironic, a jester, almost never sarcastic, who consistently honors author’s basic idea and main summary line, profusely using inexhaustible fount of tradition and people’s spirit and verbal gags in the form of words and sentences, only with more loveliness and clarity within author’s tales than public communication. Those gags sometimes appear in far more important role, as a substitute for the punch line. Uskoković’s stories theme is as rich as the life that inspires the author—social differences, inflation, moral and social deviations, bureaucracy and bureaucratic lingo, pettiness, alienation, two-facedness, all kinds of human and social flaws.”

Rastko Zakić: “Dragan Uskoković deeply understands the contrasts and paradoxes of people’s soul, which eagerly enters his stories, seeking catharsis and an explanation for its disorientation in time. Instead of rebellion and resistance, there is suffering; sorrow is inner and intimate; cry is for one’s own soul. What dominates is Uskoković’s grief for values that irretrievably disappear before the gust of the everyday, packed with troubles and disorientations amidst the new civilization order. Being contemporary to postmodernism, Uskoković, in a special and unusual way, contributes to this literary movement, using his famous monodrama Čegović as a template for a wonderful new interpretation of a similar subject in the story named Đina. In Đina, highest level of literary inspiration was achieved—how to say something with the skill of meaning, humorous cleansing and wise avoiding of the words that might cancel fragile boundaries of mutual bearing in the jaws of the life.”

Dr Raško Jovanović: “(Uskoković) humorously portrays Montenigrin mentality and a man devout to patriarchal culture—through carefully constructed flow of the story, which isn’t deprived of satirical accents—his confrontation to the phenomenons of modern civilization which he does not understand and rejects. Creative process is based, above all, on lexicon, built precisely and authentically, and the realisation that our man, from our environment, basically speaking, practices ‘actor’ way of speaking, which is dominated by wits over ‘those above’, a so-called ‘heroics’, where the aforementioned man is undisputed winner. Uskoković in his story Prispjenak, in a manner, typical for Nušić, shows resistance—in this case a young man resisting marriage—and his desire to avoid that and stay free. The act, the drama, it all allows the comedian a process to shed light upon the topic and heroes of our time."

Dr Mihailo Šćepanović: “On a linguistic level, Uskoković skilfully uses all that is given by the language itself. Starting from dual pronunciation (ekavski and ijekavski dialect), superdialectic use of the consonant H, as needed, it’s dialectic substituting i omitting; the clear intent that phonetic characteristics, such as regressive assimilation, should not be omitted, which altogether fulfills the entire stylishness of the message—by portraying rural origin of its actors from a wide Montenigrin space.”

References

1950 births
20th-century Serbian novelists
20th-century male writers
Writers from Cetinje
Serbian novelists
Writers from Belgrade
Living people